NBA scoring leader may refer to:
List of National Basketball Association annual scoring leaders
List of National Basketball Association career scoring leaders
List of National Basketball Association career playoff scoring leaders
List of National Basketball Association franchise career scoring leaders
List of National Basketball Association rookie single-season scoring leaders
List of National Basketball Association single-game scoring leaders
List of National Basketball Association single-game playoff scoring leaders
List of National Basketball Association single-season scoring leaders
List of National Basketball Association career 3-point scoring leaders
List of National Basketball Association career playoff 3-point scoring leaders
List of National Basketball Association annual three-point field goals leaders